Route 151 is a Connecticut state highway in the Connecticut River valley running from East Haddam via Moodus to the village of Cobalt in East Hampton.

Route description
Route 151 begins as Town Street at an intersection with Route 82 east of the town center of East Haddam. The road heads north for  through the village of Little Haddam up to the village of Moodus. In Moodus, the road turns west to briefly overlap southbound Route 149 along a  wrong way concurrency (as Moodus-Leesville Road).

Immediately after Route 149 splits off to the south, Route 151 crosses the Moodus River and then continues west for another mile. It then turns north along Leesville Road as it heads towards the Haddam town line. The southward continuation of Leesville Road connects with Route 149 and is an unsigned state highway known as State Road 609. After crossing the Salmon River into Haddam, the road becomes Moodus Road.

In East Hampton, Route 151 continues northwest towards the Connecticut River, bypassing the village of Haddam Neck. Beyond Haddam Neck, the road becomes Middle Haddam Road, turning northward as it begins to parallel the Connecticut River. It intersects with the access road to Hurd State Park (unsigned Special Service Road 439) along the way, passing through the village of Middle Haddam then ending at an intersection with Route 66 in the village of Cobalt.

A  section of Route 151, running from milepost 9.26 to the northern terminus, is designated a scenic road. This portion of the route runs along the east bank of the Connecticut River.

History
In the 1920s, the Moodus-Haddam Neck-Cobalt route was designated as a state highway known as Highway  167. Route 151 was established as part of the 1932 state highway renumbering and incorporated old Highway 167. In 1947, Route 151 was extended south of Moodus via the village of Little Haddam to Route 82.

Junction list

References

External links

151
Transportation in Middlesex County, Connecticut